Ángel Garasa Bergés (12 December 1905 – 27 August 1976) was a Spanish-Mexican film actor. Garasa was born in Madrid and emigrated to Mexico in 1937, fleeing the Spanish Civil War.

Selected filmography
 The Three Musketeers (1942)
 Beautiful Michoacán (1943)
 Romeo and Juliet (1943)
 El Ametralladora (1943)
 The Lieutenant Nun (1944)
 El Sexo Fuerte (1946)
 Fly Away, Young Man! (1947)
 La casa de la Troya (1948)
 Doña Clarines (1951)
 You Had To Be a Gypsy (1953)
 The Photographer (1953)
 A Tailored Gentleman (1954)
 The Fair of the Dove (1963)
 Scandal in the Family (1967)
 Un Quijote sin mancha (1969)
 Las golfas (1969)
 The Rebellious Novice (1971)
 Poor But Honest (1973)

References

Bibliography
 Pilcher, Jeffrey M. Cantinflas and the Chaos of Mexican Modernity. Rowman & Littlefield, 2001.

External links

1905 births
1976 deaths
Mexican male film actors
Spanish male film actors
People from Madrid
Spanish emigrants to Mexico